KNOD (105.3 FM, "Kool Gold 105.3") is a radio station broadcasting a classic hits music format. Licensed to Harlan, Iowa, United States, the station is currently owned by Wireless Broadcasting, L.L.C. and features programming from Citadel Media and Dial Global.

References

External links

Classic hits radio stations in the United States
NOD
Shelby County, Iowa